Syed Ali Ahsan (26 March 1922 – 25 June 2002) was a Bangladeshi poet, writer and university academic. He was awarded Ekushey Padak (1982) and Independence Day Award (1987) by the Government of Bangladesh. In 1987, he was selected as the National Professor of Bangladesh. He was credited as the official English translator of the National Anthem of Bangladesh.

Early life 
Ahsan was born on 26 March 1922, to a Bengali Muslim family of Syeds in the village of Alokdia in Magura (formerly under Jessore District), Bengal Province. His father, Syed Ali Hamed, was a school inspector. His mother, Syeda Kamrunnegar Khatun, was the daughter of Syed Mukarram Ali, the Zamindar and Pir of Agla in Nawabganj, Dhaka. His brothers were the Cambridge-educated Islamic philosopher and critic, Prof. Syed Ali Ashraf, and Syed Ali Naqi, also a professor. He grew up in an atmosphere steeped in Sufi traditions inherited from both his paternal and maternal ancestors. While studying at the Armanitola Government High School in 1937, Ahsan published a poem called The Rose in his school magazine. Subsequently, stories, essays and poems written by him in Bengali were published in magazines such as Azad, Mohammadi and Saogat. When he was a student of the department of English in Dhaka University his essay titled 'Kavi Satyendranath Dutta' was published in the quarterly Parichay, a magazine edited by Sudhindranath Dutta. As a student and later as a scholar, he was a key figure in the East Pakistan Literary Society, an influential movement for a more Islamically conscious Bengali literature; his brother Syed Ali Ashraf and his cousin Syed Sajjad Hussain were also involved. Unlike the latter two, Syed Ali Ahsan abandoned his erstwhile support of Pakistan, and became an advocate of Bangladeshi independence.

Career
Ahsan worked in All India Radio. He was a professor of department of Bengali in University of Dhaka and later, head of the department of Bengali of University of Karachi. In Karachi, he edited the Bengali Literary Review, an English-language journal loosely concerned with Bengali Muslim literature and culture; it published many writers associated with the East Pakistan Literary Society.

He was a director of Bangla Academy and was the vice chancellor of Jahangirnagar University, University of Rajshahi and Darul Ihsan University.  In addition, he was a National Professor (Jatio Addhapok) of Bangladesh. He was also an adviser of the Nobel prize committee for literature from 1976 to 1982.

He was an editor of the antique book "Bangladesh; a souvenir on the first anniversary of Victory Day, December 16, 1972.", as well.

Soon after the partition of India in 1947, Pakistan PEN was established in the year 1948. Ali Ahsan was its first secretary general while Muhammad Shahidullah was its president. When Bangladesh was born in 1971, PEN Bangladesh started its journey with Ali Ahsan as its president.

Award 
 Bangla Academy Literary Award (1967)
 Ekushey Padak (1982)
 Independence Day Award (1987)

Death 
Ahsan died on 25 July 2002. He was buried next to the Jahangirnagar University Mosque with national honour.

Works

Books
 America Amar Kichu Kotha
 Chorjageeti Proshongo
 Kobita Shomogro
 Kotha Bichitra: Bishyo Shahitto

Poetry
 Onek Akas
 Ekok Shandhay Bosonto
 Sohosha Sochokit
 Amar Protidiner Shobdo
 Somudrei Jabo

Criticism
 Nazrul Islam
 Kobitar Kotha
 Iqbaler Kobita
Rabindra kabeyr bhumika

Translations
 "Oedipus"
 "Whitemaner Kobita"

References 

1920 births
2002 deaths
Bengali-language writers
Bangladeshi male poets
Bengali male poets
Bengali-language poets
Academic staff of Jahangirnagar University
Recipients of the Ekushey Padak
Recipients of the Independence Day Award
Academic staff of the University of Rajshahi
Academic staff of the University of Dhaka
Academic staff of the University of Karachi
20th-century Bangladeshi poets
Vice-Chancellors of Jahangirnagar University
Vice-Chancellors of the University of Rajshahi
Recipients of Bangla Academy Award
20th-century Bangladeshi male writers
People from Magura District
Bangladeshi people of Arab descent
20th-century Bengalis